Vecellio is an Italian surname, and may refer to:

 Cesare Vecellio (c. 1530–1601), Italian painter
 Francesco Vecellio (c. 1485–1560), Italian painter
 Marco Vecellio (1545-1611), Italian painter
 Orazio Vecellio (c. 1528–1576), Italian painter
 Tiziano Vecellio (c. 1485–1576), Italian painter